Pain Practice is a peer-reviewed medical journal published by John Wiley & Sons on behalf of the World Institute of Pain. According to the Journal Citation Reports, the journal has a 2013 impact factor of 2.183.

References

External links 
 

Anesthesiology and palliative medicine journals
English-language journals
Wiley-Blackwell academic journals
Publications established in 2001